Arthur John Rees (1872–1942), was an Australian mystery writer.

Born in Melbourne, he was for a short time on the staff of the Melbourne Age and later joined the staff of the New Zealand Herald.

In his early twenties he likely went to England.

His proficiency as a writer of crime-mystery stories is attested by Dorothy Sayers in the introduction to Great Short Stories of Detection, Mystery and Horror, 1928. Two of his stories were included in an American world-anthology of detective stories. Some of his works were translated into French and German.

Bibliography 

 The Merry Marauders (1913)
 The Hampstead Mystery (1916) [with John Reay Watson]
 The Mystery of the Downs (1918) [with John Reay Watson]
 The Shrieking Pit (1919)
 The Hand in the Dark (1920)
 The Moon Rock (1922)
 The Island of Destiny (1923)
 The Cup of Silence (1924)
 The Threshold of Fear (1925)
 Simon of Hangletree (1926)
 Greymarsh (1927)
 Love Me Anise (1928)
 Old Sussex and Her Diarists (1929)
 The Pavilion by the Lake (1930)
 The Brink (1931)
 The Tragedy of Twelvetrees (1931)
 The Investigations of Colwin Grey (1932)
 The River Mystery (1932)
 Peak House (1933)
 Aldringham's Last Chance (1933)
 The Flying Argosy (1934)
 The Single Clue (1940)

References 

E. Morris Miller, Australian Literature: A Bibliography to 1938, Extended to 1950. Edited by Frederick T. Macartney. (Angus and Roberson, Sydney 1956)

External links
 
 
 

1872 births
1942 deaths
Australian mystery writers